John Porter-Porter (3 April 1855–10 August 1939)  was a unionist politician in Northern Ireland.

Biography
He was born John Porter Archdale on 3 April 1855, the son of Nicholas Montgomery Archdale of Crock-na-crieve, co. Fermanagh. He studied at The King's School, Worcester and Caius College, Cambridge, then resided at Belle Isle in County Fermanagh. He adopted his unusual surname of Porter-Porter in 1876, replacing Archdale with Porter, in accordance with the terms of an inheritance. 

He served as a J.P. and Deputy Lieutenant of Co. Longford and was appointed High Sheriff of Longford for 1879 and as High Sheriff of Fermanagh for 1883.

Porter-Porter was elected to the first Senate of Northern Ireland for the Ulster Unionist Party, despite his lack of political experience.  He retired from the Senate in 1937, and died two years later. He had married Josephine, the eldest daughter of Jesse Lloyd of Co. Monaghan.

References

External links
 

1855 births
1939 deaths
People educated at King's School, Worcester
Alumni of Gonville and Caius College, Cambridge
High Sheriffs of County Fermanagh
High Sheriffs of Longford
Members of the Senate of Northern Ireland 1921–1925
Members of the Senate of Northern Ireland 1925–1929
Members of the Senate of Northern Ireland 1929–1933
Members of the Senate of Northern Ireland 1933–1937
Ulster Unionist Party members of the Senate of Northern Ireland